KVVF (Latino Mix 105.7 FM) is a commercial radio station licensed to Santa Clara, California, and is simulcast on 100.7 KVVZ San Rafael.  They are owned by Univision Communications, with studios at 1940 Zanker Road in San Jose.  They serve the San Francisco Bay Area with a Spanish CHR radio format, using the slogan "Reggaeton y más."  KVVF and KVVZ are the San Jose affiliates for the Uforia Audio Network.

KVVF has an effective radiated power (ERP) of 50,000 watts.  The transmitter is off California State Route 130 in San Jose, near Mount Hamilton.  KVVF broadcasts using HD Radio technology.

History

Early years (1964–2002)

On September 25, 1964, the station signed on as KREP, owned by Robert E. Podesta and his wife Marcella. In 1972, Bob Kieve and Santa Clara Broadcasters bought KREP for $470,000 and changed the call sign to KARA, with an English-language adult contemporary format.

From 1997 to 2000, KARA was the flagship station for the San Jose Sharks NHL hockey team before KUFX took over in 2000.

Regional Mexican (2002–2014)
Kieve sold KARA in 2002 to Hispanic Broadcasting of Dallas.  It became KEMR with a Regional Mexican music format at midnight on April 1 that year.

Between 2003 and June 27, 2005, KVVF was a "pop, rock y reggaeton" station, Viva 105.7, also owned by Univision.

On October 13, 2011, the station changed its former station branding "La Kalle" to "Latino Mix."

Hot 105.7 (2014–2019)
On March 14, 2014, the station started repeatedly playing Nelly's "Hot in Herre" uninterrupted.  It was a stunting event to promote a branding change to "Hot 105.7."

On March 17, 2014, Hot 105.7 FM started broadcasting at 5:05pm, beginning with a "history lesson" about the first "Hot" station that covered the San Jose area from 1988 to 1995, followed by the return of former KMEL personality Chuy Gomez, and aired a Mix Show.  Programmed as a Rhythmic Contemporary station with a focus on hit-driven hip hop music and R&B, KVVF's target was a bilingual and younger Hispanic audience (mostly around the Southern portion of the Bay Area surrounding Santa Clara County), patterned after sister station KBBT in San Antonio. In a statement from Station Content Director Mark Arias, “We just feel like The Bay Area has been asking for something new and fresh. It’s a format they call Top 40/Rhythmic with a little bit of hip-hop, R&B and Top 40 crossed-over.”

In March 2016, after two years of modest ratings (it barely registered in Nielsen's San Francisco ratings) and difficulty competing with KMEL and KRBQ, KVVF de-emphasized its hip hop and R&B direction and added more rhythmic friendly pop hits.  Due to 105.7's strong signal over the South Bay, it also changed focus on the whole Bay Area region to concentrate on mostly San Jose and South Bay listeners as well as listeners in nearby Monterey Bay to the south.  Univision has opted to retain its simulcast on KVVZ in the process. In November 2017, they further adjusted their playlist by adding Latin hits and adopting what is essentially a three way hybrid of Rhythmic, Mainstream and Spanish CHR.

In March 2019, KVVF became the San Jose affiliate for the Uforia Audio Network, and is one of only two Rhythmic CHR affiliates in the network.

Return of "Latino Mix"
On August 30, 2019, the station started repeatedly playing J Balvin's "Reggaeton" followed by Vicente Fernández "Volver Volver" uninterrupted, reportedly an act of stunting to promote their branding and format comeback to "Latino Mix 105.7."

On September 2, 2019, Latino Mix 105.7 started broadcasting at 12:03pm, the first song played under the return to Spanish CHR format was J Balvin's "Mi Gente".

References

External links

FCC History Cards for KVVF

VVF
Univision Radio Network stations
Radio stations established in 1964
Mass media in San Jose, California
VVF
Contemporary hit radio stations in the United States
Latin rhythmic radio stations